The Tunisia national football team represented Tunisia at the FIFA Confederations Cup on one occasion, a sole appearance in 2005. Tunisia qualified for the 2005 FIFA Confederations Cup as the CAF representative after winning 2004 Africa Cup of Nations.

Record at the FIFA Confederations Cup

2005 FIFA Confederations Cup

Squad
Head coach:  Roger Lemerre

Argentina v Tunisia 

Man of the Match:
Juan Román Riquelme (Argentina)

Assistant referees:
Alessandro Griselli (Italy)
Cristiano Copelli (Italy)
Fourth official:
Manuel Mejuto González (Spain)

Tunisia v Germany 

Man of the Match:
Michael Ballack (Germany)

Assistant referees:
Anthony Garwood (Jamaica)
Joseph Taylor (Trinidad and Tobago)
Fourth official:
Matthew Breeze (Australia)

Australia v Tunisia 

Man of the Match:
Francileudo Santos (Tunisia)

Assistant referees:
Cristian Julio (Chile)
Mario Vargas (Chile)
Fourth official:
Herbert Fandel (Germany)

References 

Tunisia national football team
Countries at the FIFA Confederations Cup